Meit may refer to:
 Maydh, a city in Somalia
 Meit (Baradine County parish), in Wales, UK
 Conrad Meit, sculptor

See also 
 Meite
 Mait (disambiguation)
 Mate (disambiguation)